Radical 28 or radical private meaning "private" is one of the 23 Kangxi radicals (214 radicals total) composed of two strokes.

In the Kangxi Dictionary, there are 40 characters (out of 49,030) to be found under this radical.

 is also the 25th indexing component in the Table of Indexing Chinese Character Components predominantly adopted by Simplified Chinese dictionaries published in mainland China.

Evolution

Derived characters

See also 
 Mu (kana)

Literature

External links 

Unihan Database - U+53B6

028
025